Danilo Wyss (born 26 August 1985) is a Swiss former road racing cyclist, who rode professionally between 2008 and 2020 for the  and . He is no relation to fellow Swiss cyclist Daniel Wyss who won the Race Across America in 2006 and 2009.

Career
He competed in twelve Grand Tours during his career, finishing each one, including the Giro d'Italia for five successive years between 2010 and 2014. He won the Swiss National Road Race Championships in 2015. He was named in the start list for the 2015 Tour de France.

Major results

2003
 2nd Road race, National Junior Road Championships
2006
 10th Road race, UCI Under-23 Road World Championships
2007
 1st Stage 3 Les 3 Jours de Vaucluse
 2nd Grand Prix de Waregem
 3rd Paris–Roubaix Espoirs
 5th Road race, UCI Under-23 Road World Championships
 9th GP Herning
2008
 6th Grand Prix Pino Cerami
2009
 1st Stage 1 Tour de Beauce
2010
 9th Nokere Koerse
2012
 1st Stage 1 (TTT) Giro del Trentino
2013
 7th Grand Prix Impanis-Van Petegem
 10th Overall Ster ZLM Toer
 10th Trofeo Laigueglia
2015
 1st  Road race, National Road Championships
 1st Stage 9 (TTT) Tour de France
 8th Cadel Evans Great Ocean Road Race
 10th Grand Prix of Aargau Canton
2017
 9th Japan Cup
2018
 4th Overall Arctic Race of Norway
2020
 2nd Road race, National Road Championships

Grand Tour general classification results timeline

References

External links

 
 
 
 
 
 

1985 births
Living people
Swiss male cyclists
Sportspeople from the canton of Vaud